Joseph-Éloi Archambault (December 3, 1861 – December 23, 1916) was a Canadian politician.

Born in St-Jacques-L'Achigan, Montcalm County, Canada East, the son of Francois Archambault and Ogine Magnan, Archambault was educated at L'Assomption College and Laval University. A notary, was Mayor of St-Gabriel de Brandon, Quebec from 1895 to 1907 and Warden of the County of Berthier from 1895 to 1900. He became a member of the House of Commons of Canada for the electoral district of Berthier at a January 18, 1900 by-election by acclamation. A Liberal, he was re-elected at the general elections of 1900 and 1904.

Electoral record

References
 
 The Canadian Parliament; biographical sketches and photo-engravures of the senators and members of the House of Commons of Canada. Being the tenth Parliament, elected November 3, 1904

1861 births
1916 deaths
Liberal Party of Canada MPs
Mayors of places in Quebec
Members of the House of Commons of Canada from Quebec
Canadian notaries
Université Laval alumni